Felice Mazzù (born 12 March 1966) is a Belgian professional football manager who is currently at the helm of Belgian First Division A side Charleroi for the second time.

Mazzù has built a reputation for improving the status of smaller clubs, earning a number of promotions with regional sides, before helping Charleroi qualify for the Belgian Pro League title play-offs three times.

His most famous spell in management saw him guide Union Saint-Gilloise back to the Belgian top-flight in 2021 after 48 years away, before bringing them to the brink of the title in their first season back in the top division. 

Mazzù has also had brief spells in charge of Racing Genk and Anderlecht, leaving both clubs within six months of appointment, with both mid-table. 

In total, he has previously been in charge of RCS Nivellois, RA Marchiennoise des Sports, RCS Brainois, Léopold Uccle-Woluwe, Tubize, White Star Woluwe, Charleroi, Genk, Union SG and Anderlecht.

Coaching career
On May 31, 2022, R.S.C. Anderlecht announced that they had signed Mazzù as their new head coach. On October 24, 2022 Mazzù was sacked.

Personal life
Mazzù was born in Charleroi to an Italian father from Calabria.

Managerial statistics

Honours
White Star Woluwe
Belgian Third Division: 2010–11

Genk
Belgian Super Cup: 2019

Union SG
Belgian First Division B: 2020–21
Individual
 Belgian Professional Manager of the Season: 2021–22 
Belgian Best Coach of the Year: 2017, 2021 
 Raymond Goethals Award: 2017, 2021

References

External links

1966 births
Living people
Sportspeople from Charleroi
Belgian football managers
Belgian people of Italian descent
A.F.C. Tubize managers
R. Charleroi S.C. managers
K.R.C. Genk managers
Royale Union Saint-Gilloise managers
R.S.C. Anderlecht managers
Belgian people of Calabrian descent
Belgian Pro League managers